Stephen Allan John Crabbe (born 20 October 1954) is an English former professional footballer. He played for six Football League clubs, with his most successful spell coming at Gillingham.

Playing career
Crabbe, nicknamed "Buster" after the actor, was born in Weymouth, Dorset and began his career with Southampton where he graduated through the youth channels. He made his first-team debut in the FA Cup match against West Ham United on 4 January 1975, replacing David Peach who had been dropped following a poor performance in the previous league match. Described as "a tenacious midfielder", Crabbe retained his place for the next few Division Two matches before the arrival of Jim McCalliog at the end of January. He made occasional appearances over the rest of the year but found it hard to break into the team on a permanent basis. In March 1976 he was loaned to Hellenic in South Africa.

Upon his return to English football in January 1977 he was sold to Gillingham for £10,000. He quickly became a first team regular at Priestfield Stadium and went on to make over 180 Football League appearances, a figure which would have been higher had he not spent a long spell on the sidelines after breaking his arm in 1979.

In 1981 Crabbe moved to Carlisle United, where he helped the team gain promotion to the Second Division a year later. Shortly after this he moved to Hereford United and later had spells with Crewe Alexandra and Torquay United before dropping into non-league football in 1986 where he played for Crawley Town, Canterbury City, Ashford Town and Whitstable Town, serving as player-coach at the latter two clubs.

Summers 1984 and 1988 he played in Finland.

Managerial career
Crabbe returned to his home town as coach of Weymouth in July 1997 under manager Neil Webb. He was promoted to manager upon Webb's departure just three months later, but was himself dismissed before the end of the year. He later had a spell as assistant manager at Lordswood.

References

1954 births
Living people
Sportspeople from Weymouth
English footballers
Footballers from Dorset
Association football midfielders
English Football League players
Southampton F.C. players
Hellenic F.C. players
Gillingham F.C. players
Carlisle United F.C. players
Hereford United F.C. players
Crewe Alexandra F.C. players
Kemi City F.C. players
Torquay United F.C. players
Crawley Town F.C. players
Canterbury City F.C. players
Kuopion Palloseura players
Ashford United F.C. players
Whitstable Town F.C. players
English football managers
Weymouth F.C. managers